Kimberly D. Brooks (née Lawson) is an American voice actress who works in the voice-over, film, video games, and theatre industry. She has voiced in video games since the mid-1990s. She has played Ashley Williams in the Mass Effect series, Stormy in the Nickelodeon revival of Winx Club, Buena Girl from ¡Mucha Lucha!, Barbara Gordon in the Batman: Arkham video game series, Shinobu Jacobs in No More Heroes and No More Heroes 2: Desperate Struggle, Princess Allura from Voltron: Legendary Defender, Mee Mee in Dexter's Laboratory, Jasper in Steven Universe, Luna in the Scooby-Doo franchise as part of the Hex Girls, and Robin Ayou in Subnautica: Below Zero. Brooks won a BAFTA Award for Performer in a Supporting Role at the 18th British Academy Games Awards for her work in Psychonauts 2.

Filmography

Film

Television

Video games

References

External links

Living people
African-American actresses
American film actresses
American stage actresses
American television actresses
American video game actresses
American voice actresses
People from Los Angeles
Actresses from California
Stevenson University alumni
20th-century American actresses
21st-century American actresses
20th-century African-American women
20th-century African-American people
21st-century African-American women
21st-century African-American people
Year of birth missing (living people)
BAFTA winners (people)